Cecil Kimber (12 April 1888 – 4 February 1945) was a motor car designer, best known for his role in being the driving force behind The M.G. Car Company.

Biography

Kimber was born in London on 12 April 1888 to Henry Kimber, a printing engineer and his wife Fanny. After attending Stockport Grammar School he joined his father's company and took an early interest in motorcycles, buying a Rex model, but after an accident on a friend's machine that severely damaged his right leg he took to cars and in 1913 bought a 10 hp Singer. This interest caused him to leave the family firm in 1914 and get a job with Sheffield-Simplex as assistant to the chief designer. During World War I he moved first to AC Cars and then to component supplier EG Wrigley. He made a large personal financial investment in Wrigleys but he lost this when the company lost heavily on a deal with Angus-Sanderson for whom he had styled a radiator. Wrigley had also been a major supplier to Morris Motors Limited and was bought by W R Morris in 1923. Presumably with the help of contacts, Kimber got a job in 1921 as Sales manager with Morris Garages, also a private company owned by Morris — he founded it in 1909 — and the Morris agency in Oxford.

While at Morris Garages he developed a range of special bodies for Morris cars, which were sold under the MG brand, eventually leading in 1928 to the founding of The M.G. Car Company specialising in the production of MG sports cars. The new company moved from Oxford to Abingdon in 1929 and Kimber became managing director in July 1930. The main shareholder remained William Morris himself and in 1935 he formally sold M.G. to Morris Motors which meant Kimber was no longer in sole control and had to take instructions from head office leading to him becoming increasingly disillusioned with his role.

With the outbreak of World War II, car production stopped and at first M.G. was reduced to making basic items for the armed forces until Kimber obtained contract work on aircraft but this was done without first obtaining approval and he was asked to resign and left in 1941.

He soon found other work first with coachbuilder Charlesworth and then with specialist piston maker Specialloid.

Death 

Kimber was killed in the King's Cross railway accident on Sunday 4 February 1945, having boarded the 6:00 p.m. express to Leeds. Shortly after leaving the station and entering Gasworks Tunnel, the locomotive's wheels started slipping on a newly replaced section of rail laid on the rising gradient. The signalman noticed this and attempted to avert a collision with another train in the station by switching the points to an empty platform but was too late. The rear carriage was derailed, rolled onto its side and was crushed against the steel support of the main signal gantry. The first-class compartment where Kimber had been sitting was demolished; he and one other passenger was killed.

Cecil Kimber married twice, first to Irene (Rene) Hunt with whom he had two daughters, Lisa and Jean, and after Irene died in 1938 to Muriel Dewar. He was elected as President of the Automobile Division of the Institution of Mechanical Engineers.

References

1888 births
1945 deaths
British automobile designers
Railway accident deaths in England
Accidental deaths in London
People educated at Stockport Grammar School
British founders of automobile manufacturers
20th-century British businesspeople